Truenorth is an Icelandic film and TV production service company. It was founded in 2003 has line produced feature films for studios such as Warner Bros., Paramount Pictures, Universal Pictures, Twentieth Century Fox, DreamWorks, Columbia (Sony), Marvel Studios and Netflix. The company has offered production service in Iceland for Batman Begins, Flags of Our Fathers, Die Another Day, Lara Croft: Tomb Raider, Prometheus, Oblivion, Noah, The Secret Life of Walter Mitty, Thor: The Dark World and Sense8.

References

External links 
 True North's Web Site

Mass media companies of Iceland
Film production companies of Iceland